Herbert Thomas Knatchbull-Hugessen (1 December 1835 – 15 May 1922) was a British Conservative politician.

Born at Mersham Hatch, he was the fourth son of Sir Edward Knatchbull, 9th Baronet and his second wife Fanny Catherine Knight, niece of author Jane Austen and eldest daughter of Edward Austen-Knight. His older brother was Edward Knatchbull-Hugessen, 1st Baron Brabourne. Knatchbull-Hugessen was educated at Eton College and then at Trinity College, Oxford, where he graduated with a Master of Arts in 1859. He entered the British House of Commons in 1885, sitting for Faversham until 1895. He was influential in the foundation of the modern Kent County Cricket Club in 1870, was on the club's committee and served as president for a year in the 1880s.

On 20 September 1883, he married Elizabeth Lewis Burton, daughter of Moses Burton, and had by her eight children, six sons and two daughters.

References

External links

1835 births
1922 deaths
Conservative Party (UK) MPs for English constituencies
UK MPs 1885–1886
UK MPs 1886–1892
UK MPs 1892–1895
Alumni of Trinity College, Oxford
People educated at Eton College
Younger sons of baronets
Herbert